Vesa "Vesku" Jokinen (born 1970) is the lead singer in Finnish punk rock band Klamydia, based in Vaasa on the Finnish west coast, and in Kylähullut.

He and his friends in the band created the record label Kråklund Records in the beginning of the 1990s because they were unsatisfied with the big record companies.

He has also worked solo releasing the 2000 solo album called Outo Kunnia (meaning Strange honor in English). In 2012, he released a joint album with Sundin Pojat entitled Juuret.

Discography
(Also refer to his discography in bands Klamydia and Kylähullut)

Albums
Solo
2000: Outo kunnia
As Vesa Jokinen & Sundin Pojat

References 

People from Vaasa
20th-century Finnish male singers
1970 births
Living people
21st-century Finnish male singers
Kylähullut members